Lo Yi Ting (born 14 December 1987), is a Hong Kong basketball player, currently playing for Hong Kong A1 Division Championship club South China AA.

Lo Yi Ting started playing basketball when he was 8 years old and by 12 he was selected in the Nike League in Hong Kong. He went to Diocesan Boys' School and became a member of the school team. He played in Hong Kong's A1 Division Basketball league as a high schooler in 2004.

South China AA
After that he joined South China AA and became their main defender. In 2008 he helped South China win the Straits Cup and winning the Most Valuable Player accolade for himself.

In 2010 he helped South China win the Cup again and won himself the MVP award again. His performance caught the eye of Fujian Xunxing  and the team invited him for a trial. The transfer was confirmed in October 2010 and he became a professional basketball player.  He is the fourth Hong Kong player to play in the Chinese league.

Fujian Xunxing
He made his debut for his new team on 10 December 2010 away to Zhejiang Lions . He scored 5 points and made 3 assists, but it was not enough as Fujian Xunxing lost 100-121.

References

1987 births
Living people
Fujian Sturgeons players
South China AA basketball players
Basketball players at the 2006 Asian Games
Basketball players at the 2014 Asian Games
Shooting guards
Hong Kong men's basketball players
Asian Games competitors for Hong Kong